Barbora Krejčíková defeated Iga Świątek in the final, 5–7, 7–6(7–4), 6–3 to win the singles tennis title at the 2022 Ostrava Open.  It was Krejčíková's second WTA Tour title in back-to-back weeks, and she ended Świątek's streak of ten consecutive victories in WTA Tour finals. This marked only Świątek's second career loss in a WTA Tour-level final, out of twelve played (the other being at the 2019 Ladies Open Lugano).

Anett Kontaveit was the defending champion, but retired in the second round against Tereza Martincová.

Seeds
The top four seeds received a bye into the second round.

Draw

Finals

Top half

Bottom half

Qualifying

Seeds

Qualifiers

Qualifying draw

First qualifier

Second qualifier

Third qualifier

Fourth qualifier

Fifth qualifier

Sixth qualifier

References

 Main draw
 Qualifying draw

Ostrava Open - Singles
Ostrava Open